Oglala Dam (National ID # SD00969) is a dam in Oglala Lakota County, South Dakota, within the Pine Ridge Indian Reservation.

The earthen dam was constructed between 1938 and 1941 by the United States Bureau of Indian Affairs using labor of the Civilian Conservation Corps and the Public Works Administration.  The structure has a height of 80 feet and a length of 2600 feet at its crest.  It impounds White Clay Creek for irrigation storage.  The dam is owned and operated by the Oglala Sioux Tribe.

The reservoir it creates, Oglala Lake, has a normal water surface of 643 acres and has a maximum capacity of 18,300 acre-feet.  As a development project, even after significant government subsidies, the dam has been "a dismal failure from the year of its construction."

The Oglala Sioux Tribe website reports 3 to 4 "seasonal openings each year." The Safety of Dams Program monitors the Dam's water levels and flows for early detection of major dam breach/breaks or severe flood emergencies."

The dam and lake are just south of Oglala, South Dakota, near U.S. Route 18.

See also
Pine Ridge Indian Reservation
List of dams and reservoirs in South Dakota

External links
Oglala Lakota Sioux Tribe

References 

Dams in South Dakota
Reservoirs in South Dakota
Dams completed in 1941
Buildings and structures in Oglala Lakota County, South Dakota
Bodies of water of Oglala Lakota County, South Dakota
Public Works Administration in South Dakota
Civilian Conservation Corps in South Dakota